The Naglieri Nonverbal Ability Test (NNAT) is a nonverbal measure of general ability designed by Jack A. Naglieri and published by Pearson Education.
 The Naglieri Nonverbal Ability Test - Individual Form was first published in 1998. Two versions were published in 2007 and 2008, respectively. This includes the group administered Naglieri Nonverbal Ability Test - Second Edition and the Naglieri Nonverbal Ability Test - Online version. The most current version is NNAT3. Like all nonverbal ability tests, the NNAT is intended to assess cognitive ability independently of linguistic and cultural background.

Present use 
These tests may be administered to K–12 school children on an individual or group basis as a means to identify potentially gifted children for placement in accelerated programs. It is also used for admission by several high IQ societies; for instance Intertel accepts scores at or above the 99th percentile.

NNAT and the media 
Beginning in the 2012-13 school year, the Naglieri Nonverbal Ability Test- 2nd Edition (NNAT-2) replaced the Bracken School Readiness Assessment (BSRA) in New York City. The decision sparked some controversy because some parents considered the test too difficult.

In New York City, the NNAT-2 makes up 50% of the gifted and talented exam, the other 50% is the Otis–Lennon School Ability Test (OLSAT).

Criticism 
The NNAT has been found by one study to show excessive score variability, with within-grade standard deviations reaching as high as 20 points. This has the effect of both overrepresenting and underrepresenting index scores - that is, more students received very high or very low scores than expected. Lohman et al. found that 3.4 times as many students scored in the 130+ range on the NNAT as expected.

See also 
 Cognitive Abilities Test (CogAT, CAT)
 Cognitive Assessment System (CAS)
 Cognitive test
 Das–Naglieri cognitive assessment system
 Educational psychology
 Intelligence quotient
 Otis-Lennon School Ability Test (OLSAT)
 Raven's Progressive Matrices
 School psychology
 Stanford Binet
 Wechsler Intelligence Scale for Children (WISC)

References

Entrance examinations
Cognitive tests
Intelligence tests